Probodh Purkait is an Indian politician  belonging to the Socialist Unity Centre of India (Communist) (SUCI(C)). He represented the Kultali constituency in the West Bengal Legislative Assembly for more than thirty years.

Life

Purkait was kidnapped on the eve of the 1971 West Bengal Legislative Assembly election.

In 1996 a court case was opened against Purkait and other SUCI cadres, for the killing of two Indian National Congress supporters during a clash in 1985. On 12 November 1997, the Alipore sessions court, which held the trial, convicted six persons and acquitted 32, including Purkait. Subsequently an appeal was filed by the State Government in the High Court and in 2005 Purkait and 6 others were given life sentence for murder. SUCI has denounced the process as a false case and called the court ruling a conspiracy of Communist Party of India (Marxist) (CPI(M)). Supreme Court of India on 27 February 2007 dismissed the appeal filed by Prabodh Purkait against the judgment passed by the Division Bench of the Calcutta High Court.

References

Socialist Unity Centre of India (Communist) politicians
Living people
Bengali politicians
Indian atheists
Anti-revisionists
Indian communists
Indian politicians convicted of crimes
Politicians convicted of murder
Year of birth missing (living people)